Joe Riding (born August 8, 1962) is an American politician.  A Democrat, he served in the Iowa House of Representatives from 2013 to 2015.

Early life and political career
Riding was born in St. Paul, Minnesota on August 8, 1962. He was raised in Altoona, Iowa, and graduated from Southeast Polk High School before earning a degree from Upper Iowa University. Riding and his wife Leann own the Terrace Hills Golf Course. He won the Iowa House of Representatives, District 30 seat in 2012, facing Republican candidate Jim Carley. Riding lost to Zach Nunn in a 2014 bid for a second term, and lost again to Nunn in 2016.

As a member of the Iowa House, Riding served on several committees, among them the Commerce, Local Government, Transportation, and Ways and Means committees.  He also served as a member of the Administration and Regulation Appropriations Subcommittee.

Electoral history
*incumbent

References

External links

Representative Joe Riding official Iowa General Assembly site
 

1962 births
Politicians from Saint Paul, Minnesota
Upper Iowa University alumni
Democratic Party members of the Iowa House of Representatives
Living people
People from Altoona, Iowa
21st-century American politicians